Beatrix Timbrell Bulstrode (born  Mary Beatrix Nunns in 1869, later known as  Beatrix Manico Gull after second marriage, died 1951) was a British journalist and explorer. She is best known for her journey through China and Mongolia in the early twentieth century, which she wrote about in a 1920 book, A Tour in Mongolia.

Biography 
Bulstrode was born Mary Beatrix Nunns in 1869 in Sussex. She later became a journalist and was on the council of the Society of Woman Journalists. In 1891, she married Herbert Timbrell Bulstrode, who died in 1911. Bulstrode wanted to travel after the death of her first husband. 

Bulstrode toured Mongolia twice. The first journey used local guides and she was accompanied by a missionary from Finland. Her second trip was with Edward Manico Gull, who she later married. On her travels, she carried a concealed Mauser C96 that she was practiced in using. She also had two Colt revolvers and a shotgun. The entire journey cost her $1,500.

Bulstrode began her journey in September 1911, starting out at Hong Kong. She took a boat to Fuzhow, where she was able to tour southern China. She took another boat trip to the mouth of the Yangzste River and then traveled  up the river part-way with a local crew and later on a British steamer. She next traveled near Yichang and then went back to Hankou. From there, she traveled to the capital, Beijing. From the capital, she traveled through Zhangjiakou in a cart to Mongolia. Once in Mongolia, she traveled  through open country, encountering Nomadic people. Bulstrode decided not to cross the Gobi Desert and returned to Beijing. 

In Beijing, she met Edward Manico Gull who worked for customs in China. They decided to travel to northern Mongolia together and felt they each had complementary skills needed for the journey. They took a train to Werkneudinsk in Siberia and then traveled up the Selenga River in a steamboat. They came to Kyakhta, where Russian customs held them up for some time because of their weapons and ammunition. Finally, they hired a three-horse cart known as a taranta, and began their journey to the capital of Mongolia, Ulaanbaatar. In the capital, she visited a "dungeon," where she described around 150 prisoners, most with life sentences being kept in small boxes, similar to Coffins. She also related an incident where she watched the execution of three soldiers from this prison. Leaving the capital, they traveled by orton  and reached Kyakhta. Then they went back to Siberia, took the Trans-Siberian Railway to St. Petersburg and finally returned to Britain.

Bulstrode published a book about her travels in 1920 called A Tour in Mongolia. She begins the stories of her travels in Beijing. The Washington Journal called A Tour in Mongolia a "vivid account" of her journey.

Bulstrode continued to stay involved with China, working to provide relief work in that country in 1937. Bulstrode died in 1951 in Surrey.

Images

References

External links 
A Tour in Mongolia

1869 births
1951 deaths
British women journalists
British travel writers
British explorers
People from Sussex
People from Surrey (before 1965)
British women travel writers